The following is the standings of the Iran Football's 2nd Division 2002-03 football season.

First round

Group A

Group B

Second round

See also
 2002–03 Azadegan League
 2002–03 Hazfi Cup
 Iranian Super Cup

3
League 2 (Iran) seasons